Daniel Scott Sullivan (born November 13, 1964) is an American politician and attorney serving as the junior United States senator from Alaska since 2015. A member of the Republican Party, Sullivan previously served as the commissioner of the Alaska Department of Natural Resources from 2010 to 2013, and as the Alaska Attorney General from 2009 to 2010.

Sullivan grew up in a suburb of Cleveland, Ohio. He studied economics at Harvard University, then earned joint foreign service and Juris Doctor degrees from Georgetown University. He was in active duty for the United States Marine Corps from 1993 to 1997, 2004 to 2006, and in 2009 and 2013. Between 1997 and 1999, he clerked for judges on the United States Court of Appeals for the Ninth Circuit and the Alaska Supreme Court. After working as an attorney in private practice in Anchorage, Alaska from 2000 to 2002, Sullivan moved to Maryland to work for the Bush administration; he worked with the National Economic Council and the National Security Council and later served as Assistant Secretary of State for Economic and Business Affairs.

Sullivan ran in the 2014 election for the U.S. Senate seat held by Democratic incumbent Mark Begich. In August 2014, he won the Republican primary, defeating Alaska Lieutenant Governor Mead Treadwell and 2010 Senate nominee Joe Miller. Sullivan defeated Begich in the general election, 47.96% to 45.83%, a margin of 6,014 votes out of 282,400 cast. He was reelected in 2020, defeating independent challenger Al Gross by about 13 percentage points.

Early life and education
Sullivan was born and raised in Fairview Park, Ohio, the son of Sandra (née Simmons) and Thomas C. Sullivan. Sullivan's father is the president and CEO of RPM International, a publicly traded multinational corporation with over 15,000 employees that was founded by Sullivan's grandfather, Frank C. Sullivan. 

Sullivan graduated from Culver Military Academy in Indiana in 1983. He then studied economics at Harvard University, graduating in 1987 with a Bachelor of Arts degree magna cum laude. He then went to Georgetown University, where he jointly attended the Walsh School of Foreign Service and the Georgetown University Law Center, receiving joint Juris Doctor and Master of Science in Foreign Service degrees in 1993. Sullivan was a member of the Georgetown Law Journal and received his Juris Doctor degree with cum laude honors.

Early career

Military service
Sullivan joined the United States Marine Corps in 1993 after completing his law and foreign service degrees. He was on active duty from 1993 to 1997, when he transitioned to the U.S. Marine Corps Reserve. Sullivan has spent several years with a reconnaissance battalion based in Anchorage, and has since been recalled to active duty three times: from 2004 to 2006, again in early 2009, and for a six-week tour in Afghanistan in July 2013. Sullivan is currently a colonel in the Marine Corps Reserve. He is a recipient of the Defense Meritorious Service Medal.

Early legal career
After leaving active duty in the Marines, Sullivan served as a law clerk to judge Andrew Kleinfeld of the U.S. Court of Appeals for the Ninth Circuit from 1997 to 1998 and to chief justice Warren Matthews of the Alaska Supreme Court from 1998 to 1999. In 2000, Sullivan joined the Anchorage office of the law firm Perkins Coie, where he worked in commercial law and corporate law. He joined the Alaska bar that same year.

White House and State Department
In 2002, Sullivan headed the International Economics Directorate of the National Economic Council and National Security Council staffs at the White House. He advised President George W. Bush and the National Security Advisor and NEC chairman. He left the White House in 2004.

In 2006, Bush appointed Sullivan United States Assistant Secretary of State for Economic, Energy, and Business Affairs. The United States Senate unanimously confirmed Sullivan in May of that year. He served in this capacity until January 2009. While serving as Assistant Secretary of State he owned a house in Anchorage and continued to vote in Alaska elections by absentee ballot, while claiming Bethesda, Maryland, as his primary residence for tax purposes.

Alaska Attorney General
Alaska Attorney General Talis Colberg resigned in February 2009 over the Alaska Public Safety Commissioner dismissal scandal. Governor Sarah Palin nominated Wayne Anthony Ross for attorney general, but the Alaska Legislature rejected Ross. Palin then nominated Sullivan. He was sworn into office in June 2009, while the Alaska Legislature was out of session. The Alaska Legislature unanimously confirmed Sullivan's appointment on April 9, 2010. Sullivan, who had been retained by Governor Sean Parnell, stepped down as attorney general on December 5, 2010, to be replaced by John J. Burns.

Commissioner of the Alaska Department of Natural Resources
On November 18, 2010, shortly after being elected, Alaska Governor Sean Parnell appointed Sullivan Commissioner of the Alaska Department of Natural Resources, replacing former Commissioner Thomas E. Irwin. In 2013, during his term in office, Sullivan was deployed to Afghanistan for six weeks, in his role as the executive officer of the 4th Marine Division's Anti-Terrorism Battalion.

U.S. Senate

Elections

2014

On October 15, 2013, Sullivan announced his candidacy for the U.S. Senate seat held by Democratic incumbent Mark Begich in the 2014 election. He was endorsed by the Club for Growth. Begich had defeated longtime incumbent Ted Stevens in the previous election. Stevens had filed for the election in 2009 following his exoneration, and was widely expected to win, but died in a plane crash on August 9, 2010. This left the race for the Republican nomination wide open.

On June 10, 2014, Sullivan offered Begich the Alaska Agreement. This was a modified version of the People's Pledge. This tactic had previously been used in the Massachusetts 2012 U.S. Senate race between Elizabeth Warren and Scott Brown to drastically limit outside, third-party spending. Begich rejected the agreement. According to Ballotpedia, outside spending in the race hit nearly $40 million.

Despite former Governor Sarah Palin's late-race endorsement of 2010 party nominee Joe Miller, Sullivan won the August 19 Republican primary with 40% of the vote to and Miller's 32% and Treadwell's 25%.

On November 12, 2014, the Associated Press and CNN declared that Sullivan had defeated Begich in the general election by about 8,000 votes—48.6% to 45.4%. At the time, there were approximately 31,000 votes left to count and Begich refused to concede. Begich eventually conceded on November 17. Final results showed that Sullivan won by 6,014 votes out of 282,400 cast, 47.96% to 45.83%.

2020

In the 2020 election, after running unopposed in the Republican primary election, Sullivan faced independent candidate Al Gross, an orthopedic surgeon and former commercial fisherman who had been nominated by the Alaska Democratic Party. The race was considered "unexpectedly close," with some polls indicating that the two candidates were neck-and-neck. Gross touted his "deep roots" in the state and published several campaign videos that received national attention. In addition to the Democratic Senatorial Campaign Committee's funding of Gross's candidacy, Gross reportedly did "an excellent job fundraising", outraising Sullivan between July 1 and the end of September 2019.

While the race was considered "too early to call" for several days after the November 3 election, Gross called Sullivan to concede on November 13. Ultimately, Sullivan defeated Gross 54% to 41%, with Alaskan Independence Party nominee John Howe receiving nearly 5% of the vote.

Tenure
Sullivan was sworn into office on January 6, 2015, by Vice President Joe Biden.

Committee assignments 

 Committee on Armed Services
 Subcommittee on Airland
 Subcommittee on Readiness and Management Support (Ranking Member)
 Subcommittee on Strategic Forces
 Committee on Commerce, Science, and Transportation
 Subcommittee on Aviation Operations, Safety, and Security
 Subcommittee on Communications, Technology, Innovation, and the Internet
 Subcommittee on Oceans, Atmosphere, Fisheries, and Coast Guard
 Subcommittee on Space, Science and Competitiveness
 Subcommittee on Surface Transportation and Merchant Marine Infrastructure, Safety, and Security
 Committee on Environment and Public Works
 Subcommittee on Fisheries, Water and Wildlife 
 Subcommittee on Superfund, Waste Management, and Regulatory Oversight
 Committee on Veterans' Affairs

Caucuses 
Senate Republican Conference

Political positions
According to FiveThirtyEight, Sullivan voted in line with President Donald Trump's position 91.5% of the time. According to the American Conservative Union's Center for Legislative Accountability, Sullivan had a lifetime conservative rating of 79.5. Americans for Democratic Action gave Sullivan a zero on their liberalism score in 2019.

Abortion

Sullivan is a self-described "pro-life Catholic" and supported the June 2022 overturning of Roe v. Wade. He supports improving child care and adoption as alternatives to abortion.

Donald Trump 
Sullivan opposed Trump during the 2016 presidential race, releasing a statement that said, "We need national leaders who can lead by example" on issues of sexual assault and violence against women. Sullivan added, "The reprehensible revelations about Donald Trump have shown that he can't. Therefore, I am withdrawing my support for his candidacy."

Sullivan voted to acquit Trump at the conclusion of his first impeachment trial. During Sullivan's reelection bid, Trump endorsed him, saying Sullivan supported Trump's agenda.

By October 6, 2020, Sullivan announced that he would be voting for Trump, saying the choice was "very clear." Sullivan also voted to acquit Trump during his second impeachment trial.

Environment
Sullivan rejects that there is a scientific consensus on climate change. He has argued that "the verdict is still out on the human contribution to climate change"; the scientific consensus is that human activity is a primary contributor to climate change.

In October 2020, the Environmental Investigation Agency recorded and published conversations between undercover actors, who pretended to be potential investors in Pebble Mine in Alaska, and corporate executives. In these recordings, the corporate executives make clear that they intend to expand the mine far beyond previously stated intentions, and that they believe Sullivan would quietly support this project after the election. In response, Sullivan expressed his opposition to the project. Sullivan has stated that he plans to donate campaign contributions received from Pebble Mine executives to charity.

Sullivan has lobbied the Trump administration to open up the Tongass National Forest in Alaska to logging and other forms of development. In October 2020, the Trump administration permitted such projects, stripping protections that had been in place for nearly two decades.

Foreign policy 
In July 2017, Sullivan co-sponsored the Israel Anti-Boycott Act (s. 720), which made it a federal crime for Americans to encourage or participate in boycotts against Israel and Israeli settlements in the occupied territories if protesting actions by the Israeli government.

On June 6, 2021, Sullivan and Senators Tammy Duckworth and Christopher Coons visited Taipei in an U.S. Air Force C-17 Globemaster III transport to meet President Tsai Ing-wen and Minister Joseph Wu during the pandemic outbreak of Taiwan to announce President Joe Biden's donation plan of 750,000 COVID-19 vaccines included in the global COVAX program.

Gun policy
In the 2014 Senate campaign in Alaska, the National Rifle Association (NRA) declined to make an endorsement. The NRA gave Begich an "A−" rating and Sullivan an "A−q" rating, the "q" indicating the rating was qualified because Sullivan had no voting record at the time.

Health care and public health
Sullivan opposes the Affordable Care Act and voted to repeal it.

On November 17, 2020, during the COVID-19 pandemic, Sullivan did not wear a mask while presiding over the Senate. Senator Sherrod Brown asked him to "please wear a mask as he speaks." Sullivan told Brown he was not taking instructions from Brown and later called Brown a "far-left senator." Senator Ted Cruz called Brown an "ass" for making the request and suggested it was virtue signaling. CDC guidelines at the time stated that people should wear face masks while indoors.

Judiciary
In 2016, Sullivan defended the Republican refusal to hold a hearing for President Barack Obama's Supreme Court nominee, Merrick Garland, on the basis that the nomination was made "in the midst of an important national election." Sullivan said it was not "about the individual, it's about the principle" and "Alaskans deserve to have a voice in that direction through their vote, and we will ensure that they have one." In October 2020, in the last few weeks before the 2020 presidential election, Sullivan defended Trump's decision to nominate a Supreme Court justice—saying he was "well within his constitutional authority"—and voted to confirm the nominee, Amy Coney Barrett.

Missile defense system

Social policy
Sullivan has not made social issues a major part of his platform. He opposes abortion, except in cases of rape, incest, or threat to the life of the mother. He opposes same-sex marriage.

Sullivan introduced the bipartisan criminal justice reform legislation, the FIRST STEP Act, but opposed the act after incurring amendments by the House of Representatives. The amended bill passed the Senate 87–12 on December 18, 2018. Trump signed the bill into law 3 days later.

Sullivan has cosponsored the bipartisan STATES Act proposed in the 115th U.S. Congress by Massachusetts Senator Elizabeth Warren and Colorado Senator Cory Gardner that would exempt individuals or corporations in compliance with state cannabis laws from federal enforcement of the Controlled Substances Act.

2021 National Defense Authorization Act

In December 2020, during his lame-duck period, Trump vetoed the National Defense Authorization Act for Fiscal Year 2021. The veto left new Coast Guard cutters that were scheduled to be homeported in Alaska without port facilities to maintain them. Sullivan questioned the veto, because it put in question whether the cutters could be placed in Alaska.

2021 storming of the United States Capitol
On May 28, 2021, Sullivan voted against creating an independent commission to investigate the 2021 United States Capitol attack.

Personal life
While at Georgetown, Sullivan met fellow law student Julie Fate, a staffer for U.S. Senator Ted Stevens. Sullivan and Fate married and had three daughters. Fate is the daughter of retired dentist and former Alaska State Representative Hugh "Bud" Fate and Mary Jane Fate, who was once the co-chair of the Alaska Federation of Natives.

As of 2018, according to OpenSecrets.org, Sullivan's net worth was more than $2.3 million.

Electoral history

References

External links

 Senator Dan Sullivan official U.S. Senate website
 Dan Sullivan for Senate
 
 
 

|-

|-

|-

|-

1964 births
Living people
21st-century American politicians
Alaska Attorneys General
Alaska lawyers
Alaska Republicans
United States Marine Corps personnel of the War in Afghanistan (2001–2021)
Culver Academies alumni
Federalist Society members
Georgetown University Law Center alumni
Harvard University alumni
Walsh School of Foreign Service alumni
Lawyers from Anchorage, Alaska
Military personnel from Anchorage, Alaska
Military personnel from Ohio
People from Bethesda, Maryland
People from Fairview Park, Ohio
Politicians from Anchorage, Alaska
Republican Party United States senators from Alaska
State cabinet secretaries of Alaska
United States Department of State officials
United States Marine Corps officers
United States Marine Corps reservists
White House Fellows
People associated with Perkins Coie